Mehrabad (also Romanized as Mehrābād) is a village in Bahreman Rural District, Nuq District, Rafsanjan County, Kerman Province, Iran. At the 2006 census, its population was 11, in 4 families.

References 

Populated places in Rafsanjan County